Juan Ignacio Chela and Gastón Gaudio were the defending champions, but did not participate this year.

David Ferrer and Santiago Ventura won the title, defeating Gastón Etlis and Martín Rodríguez 6–3, 6–4 in the final.

Seeds

Draw

Draw

References
Draw

Chile Open (tennis)
2005 ATP Tour